Ischnolepis is a species of plants in the family Apocynaceae first described as a genus in 1909. It contains only one known recognized species, Ischnolepis graminifolia, endemic to Madagascar.

References

Endemic flora of Madagascar
Periplocoideae
Monotypic Apocynaceae genera
Taxa named by Joseph Marie Henry Alfred Perrier de la Bâthie
Taxa named by Henri Lucien Jumelle